Lefébure is a Norman-Picard surname, variation of Lefebvre and may refer to:

 Louis James Alfred Lefébure-Wély (1817–1869), French organist and composer
 Eugène Lefébure (1838–1908), French Egyptologist
 Yvonne Lefébure (1898–1986), French pianist
 Estelle Lefébure (born 1966), French model

See also 

 Nicasius le Febure
 Lefebvre
 Lefèvre
 Lefebre

Surnames of Norman origin